The Whole Family: a Novel by Twelve Authors (1908) is a collaborative novel told in twelve chapters, each by a different author. This unusual project was conceived by novelist William Dean Howells and carried out under the direction of Harper's Bazaar editor Elizabeth Jordan, who (like Howells) would write one of the chapters herself. Howells's idea for the novel was to show how an engagement or marriage would affect and be affected by an entire family. The project became somewhat curious for the way the authors' contentious interrelationships mirrored the sometimes dysfunctional family they described in their chapters. Howells had hoped Mark Twain would be one of the authors, but Twain did not participate. Other than Howells himself, Henry James was probably the best-known author to contribute. The novel was serialized in Harper's Bazaar in 1907–08 and published as a book by Harper's in late 1908.

Chapters and authors
The Father by William Dean Howells
The Old-Maid Aunt by Mary E. Wilkins Freeman
The Grandmother by Mary Heaton Vorse
The Daughter-in-Law by Mary Stewart Cutting
The School-Girl by Elizabeth Jordan
The Son-in-Law by John Kendrick Bangs
The Married Son by Henry James
The Married Daughter by Elizabeth Stuart Phelps Ward
The Mother by Edith Wyatt
The School-Boy by Mary Raymond Shipman Andrews
Peggy by Alice Brown
The Friend of the Family by Henry van Dyke

The highest paid of the contributors was Ward, who asked for $750. Van Dyke was paid $600, Brown $500, James $400, Cutting $350, Freeman $250, and Howells contributed without additional payment.

Plot summary
In the opening chapter Howells introduces the Talbert family, middle-class New England proprietors of a silverplate works that turns out ice-pitchers and other mundane household items. Daughter Peggy Talbert has just returned from her coeducational college engaged to a harmless but rather weak young man named Harry Goward.

Eventually, after many twists and turns introduced by the subsequent contributors, Harry Goward is dismissed as a suitor, Aunt Elizabeth is sent off to New York City, and a more suitable mate for Peggy is found in a college professor named Stillman Dane. Peggy marries Dane and the couple sails off to Europe with Peggy's brother Charles and his wife Lorraine for a honeymoon tour.

Composition and publication history

William Dean Howells conceived of the project in the spring of 1906 as a showpiece of his brand of literary realism. He enlisted the help of Elizabeth Jordan, then editor of Harper's Bazar, and pitched the book as an opportunity to create "a showplace for Harper's family of authors". Jordan was excited and hoped "to bring together the greatest, grandest, most gorgeous group of authors ever collaborating on a literary production". Mark Twain may have inspired the collaboration after previously suggesting a similar project involving himself, Thomas Bailey Aldrich, Bret Harte, and others, though the idea was dismissed. For The Whole Family, Twain was offered the light-hearted school-boy chapter but declined.

Howells was concerned about which writers would contribute, especially if he intended to contribute a chapter himself. As he wrote to Jordan, "If you find the scheme does not commend itself to the more judicious and able among the writers to whom you propose it, you had better drop it. I should not like to appear in co-operation with young or unimportant writers." Jordan set about finding contributors, though only half of those approached agreed to the project. Howells had predicted that neither Edith Wharton nor Henry James would be willing, though James ultimately did contribute. James, in fact, was immediately impressed with the idea and wrote to Jordan he was interested in writing any of several characters' chapters. Hamlin Garland declined to take part and Kate Douglas Wiggin withdrew after initially agreeing.

It was Howells's intention that each of the authors would examine the impact of Peggy's engagement on a different member of the Talbert family. The second chapter, by Mary E. Wilkins Freeman, immediately disrupted Howells's intended trajectory. Freeman apparently took issue with Howells's reference to the old maid aunt as a quiet old spinster and transforms her from a minor character to be pitied into a major one to be envied. Her character, Aunt Elizabeth or "Lily", was instead a vibrant and sexually attractive woman who doesn't mind getting noticed by Peggy's fiancé.

Jordan, herself unmarried, was impressed by Freeman's character and, as she called it, the "explosion of a bombshell on our literary hearthstone", but she dealt with considerable negative response from some of the other collaborators, particularly Howells and van Dyke. Howells, never particularly comfortable with frank sexuality, recoiled from Freeman's spicy conception of a character he had intended as a harmless old lady. Contributor Henry Van Dyke, who would eventually write the concluding chapter, reacted in a half-humorous, half-worried letter to Jordan:

Freeman, who had been single until her marriage at age 49, defended herself to Jordan by noting the changing role of single women:

As subsequent critics have pointed out, the rest of the novel became an effort by the later writers to cope somehow with this introduction of Aunt Elizabeth as a sexual competitor with Peggy for her fiancé's affections.

The book was first serialized in Harper's Bazar from 1907 to 1908. In serial form, the chapters were published anonymously, though there was an accompanying list of contributors and a teasing note that an "intelligent reader" would "experience no difficulty in determining which author wrote each chapter—perhaps. Elizabeth Jordan later utilized the collaborative authorship approach in the book The Sturdy Oak (1917), in which several authors wrote on behalf of woman's suffrage.

Key themes

Critics, both contemporary and modern, have concentrated on the interactions of the various writers more than the actual substance of the book. As several commentators have pointed out, each writer seemed to want to bend the novel to his or her own particular vision of the plot and characters.

Freeman's reinvention of the maiden aunt as an independent, sexually alluring woman has come in for much comment, favorable and not. Feminist critics have applauded Freeman's imagining of Aunt Elizabeth as a lively woman of spirit and intelligence. Others, such as contributor Alice Brown, thought Aunt Elizabeth was a gauche projection of Freeman's own personal issues. Brown believed that in creating Aunt Elizabeth, Freeman was reacting subconsciously to growing older. (In 1902 at age 49 Freeman had married a man seven years younger than herself, and the marriage proved unhappy.) Whatever the truth of this conjecture, Brown's penultimate chapter tied up the loose ends of the plot and helped resolve many of the difficulties of the collaboration.

The book's treatment of the issues of family, marriage and women's roles in society has generated some comment, often colored by the personal ideology of the commentator. Critics of all persuasions have admired editor Elizabeth Jordan's firm control over what sometimes threatened to be a hopelessly contentious project. Contributor Edith Wyatt, for instance, originally produced an unpublishable chapter, a series of letters that were out of harmony with the rest of the book. Jordan finally coaxed a rewritten and acceptable chapter from her. Then there were the inevitable disputes over payments. Many authors were insistent on generous compensation; Elizabeth Stuart Phelps demanded no less than $750, for example, easily equivalent to $15,000 in today's pre-tax money. And simply assembling the cast of authors was no easy task, as some writers—particularly Mark Twain—declined to participate in what some regarded as a literary stunt.

Critical response

The novel's contemporary reception was favorable, with decent sales and mostly positive reviews. Its contemporary popularity was spurred by the literary novelty of the project, as well as the guesswork required from its initial anonymous publication, in addition to rumors of in-fighting between contributors.

Many years after the book was published, Elizabeth Jordan exclaimed in her autobiography: "The Whole Family was a mess!" Critic Alfred Bendixen sympathized when he wrote: "As The Whole Family developed, the plot increasingly focused on family misunderstandings and family rivalries, which were mirrored by the artistic rivalries of the authors. The writing of the novel became a contest as much as it was a collaboration, with each author trying hard to impose his vision on the entire work."

In his long, dense but insightful chapter, and with charged rhetoric reminiscent of his late novels, Henry James has the aesthetic son Charles Talbert rail against the frustrations that he and his equally artistic wife Lorraine experience due to the claustrophobic realities of family life in his small New England town:

It's in fact in this beautiful desperation that we spend our days, that we face the pretty grim prospect of new ones, that we go and come and talk and pretend, that we consort, so far as in our deep-dyed hypocrisy we do consort, with the rest of the Family, that we have Sunday supper with the Parents and emerge, modestly yet virtuously shining, from the ordeal; that we put in our daily appearance at the Works—for a utility nowadays so vague that I'm fully aware (Lorraine isn't so much) of the deep amusement I excite there, though I also recognize how wonderfully, how quite charitably, they manage not to break out with it: bless, for the most part, their dear simple hearts!

James might as well have been talking about the frustrations that many of the authors felt with the "family" of their collaborators.

References

Further reading
The Whole Family, foreword by June Howard, introduction by Alfred Bendixen, Duke University Press 2001 
Publishing the Family by June Howard, Duke University Press 2001

External links

Competing for the Reader, dissertation by Heidi Michelle Hanrahan with an extensive chapter on The Whole Family
 

1908 American novels
Novels first published in serial form
Works originally published in Harper's Bazaar
Collaborative novels
Harper & Brothers books